Anita Ortega is an Afro-Puerto Rican former collegiate basketball player at UCLA. She was an All-American. The team went on to defeat the University of Maryland, College Park in 1978 to take the Division I collegiate title (National Champions). In 1979, she played in the 1979 Pan American Games, representing Puerto Rico. Her father was born in Bayamón.

Ortega played in the Women's Basketball League (WBL) from 1979 to 1981.  She was an all-star for the San Francisco Pioneers. In 1982, Ortega returned to her alma mater as an assistant basketball coach.  

In 1984, Ortega pursued a career in law enforcement. She presently holds the rank of captain with the Los Angeles Police Department.  She also officiates Division I women's basketball.

Years
In 2002, Ortega was inducted into the UCLA Hall of Fame.

In 2003, Ortega was featured in the Los Angeles Times-- "In Either Role, She's a True Officer of the Court"
 
In 2006, Ortega and her law enforcement background were used to develop a character in John Kuri's novel, Takin' it Back.

In 2006, Ortega was also featured in the book Mad Seasons:  The Story of the First Women's Professional Basketball League, 1978-1981, by Karra Porter (University of Nebraska Press, May 2006).  In the same year, Ortega was nominated as the chair for the National Association of Sports Officials (NASO) board of directors.

In 2007, Ortega prepared her blog addressing the benefits of Title IX.  It can viewed at www.licensetothrive.org/story/detail/id/11.

In 2007, Ortega participated in the national UCLA alumni commercial entitled "My Big UCLA Moment." The UCLA commercial is featured on YouTube.

In 2008, Ortega was featured in the Los Angeles Times--"Anita Ortega's Drive at UCLA Pays off for LAPD."  The article can be viewed at www.articles.latimes.com/2008/jun30/sports/sp-crowe30.

In 2008, Ortega was described as a UCLA Success Story.  It can be viewed on http://www.spotlight.ucla.edu/alumni/Ortega-ortega/.

In 2009, Ortega was assigned to Hollenbeck Police Station where she is the first Afro-Puerto Rican female to manage and supervise an area command. 

In 2011, Ortega was inducted into the Western States Police and Fire Games Hall of Fame.

In September 2011, Ortega was the recipient of The Boyle Heights Technology Youth Center's Bridge Award.

In October 2011, Ortega was honored as the UCLA Latina Alumna of the Year.

Ortega was selected by the 68th Speaker of the California State Assembly, John Perez, as the 2012 Woman of the Year for the 46th district.

In July 2012, as part of the 40th anniversary of Title IX, Ortega was recognized as one of UCLA's 40 "game-changers" in women's athletics. UCLABRUINS.COM

In 2012, Captain Ortega participated in the UCLA Commercial about the opening of the "New" Pauley Pavilion in an LAPD uniform.

In May 2013, Captain Ortega was recognized by the Rotary Club of East Los Angeles as the 2013 "Community Champion."

In May 2013, Ortega was inducted into the Los Angeles Section Athletic Hall of Fame.

In July 2013, Ortega was recognized as a 'Woman of Excellence' by the National Latina Business Women Association.

in 2014, Ortega was selected as one of its UCLA Optimists.

In March 2014, Ortega was the keynote speaker at the National Girls and Women's in Sports Day Event in El Paso, Texas.

In August 2014, Ortega was recognized as a 'Roman of Excellence' by her high school alma mater--Los Angeles High School.

In May 2015, Ortega was one of seven UCLA alumni to be honored that year.  She received the award for Public Service. View the video at http://alumni.ucla.edu/share/ucla-awards/bio/Ortega-ortega.aspx

In May 2015, Ortega received the Directors' Award from the Hollenbeck Youth Center for her dedicated service to the community and youth.

In June 2016, Ortega retired from the Los Angeles Police Department after 32 years.

In June 2017, Ortega delivered the UCLA commencement address to UCLA's largest graduating class.

In 2020, Ortega was inducted into the Southern League Hall of Fame. In 2021, she was also inducted into the Southern California Basketball Hall of Fame. https://www.si.com/college/ucla/mens-basketball/alumni-make-scbbhof-2021-class

UCLA statistics

Source

References

External links
 Anita Ortega: My Big UCLA Moment
 Anita Ortega: A Bruin success story
 Anita Ortega's YouTube Channel

Living people
Puerto Rican women's basketball players
UCLA Bruins women's basketball players
Puerto Rican women's basketball coaches
UCLA Bruins women's basketball coaches
Year of birth missing (living people)
Women's Professional Basketball League players